Călin Vieru (born 29 June 1965) is a Moldovan politician.

Biography 

Călin Vieru was born to Raisa and Grigore Vieru. He has been a member of the Parliament of Moldova since May 2009.

External links 
 Scandal în familia Vieru
 Site-ul Parlamentului Republicii Moldova
 Site-ul Partidului Liberal

References

1965 births
Living people
Politicians from Chișinău
Liberal Democratic Party of Moldova MPs
Moldovan MPs 2009
Moldovan MPs 2009–2010